Carl James Falivene Sr. (c. 1927 – September 28, 2015) was an American football player and coach. He served as the last-to-date varsity head football coach at the University of Vermont in Burlington, Vermont from 1972 until the program was shuttered in 1974.

As a college football player, he played for a short period at Notre Dame under Hall of Fame head coach Frank Leahy until injuries derailed his career there.  He transferred to Syracuse University where he was a standout fullback and linebacker

Head coaching record

References

Year of birth missing
1920s births
2015 deaths
American football fullbacks
American football linebackers
Hofstra Pride football coaches
Notre Dame Fighting Irish football players
Syracuse Orange football players
Vermont Catamounts football coaches
Williams Ephs football coaches
High school football coaches in Arkansas
People from Schenectady, New York